William Provan Hurrell (28 January 1920 – 24 December 1999) born in Dundee, Scotland, is a Scottish footballer who played as an inside forward in the Football League. He left Raith Rovers for a fee of £2,000 to join Millwall in 1946 where he stayed until 1952 before spending one season at Queens Park Rangers. In 1954 he commenced two seasons in Non-League football with Tunbridge Wells United before moving on to Chatham Town.

References

External links

1920 births
1999 deaths
Scottish footballers
Footballers from Dundee
Queens Park Rangers F.C. players
Raith Rovers F.C. players
Millwall F.C. players
English Football League players
Tunbridge Wells F.C. players
Association football inside forwards